Mohamad Bash or Mohamed Bash is a Syrian singer, writer and composer.

Career 
Bash in February 2009 was admitted to the sixth season of the Lebanese reality TV and talent show Star Academy.  Twenty candidates, from all over the Middle East aiming at starship, get to compete for the “Star” title of the talent show. Bash's journey on the talent show ended one step away from the semifinal phase.

Bash was invited for the opening ceremony of the Syrian 2009 International Film Festival.  The event took place in the capital city of Damascus in October 2009. This event was a crucial introduction of Bash as a professional artist in the music and entertainment world.

Composed and written by Bash, “Rah Ensaki” is the first official single that was released in November 2010.

In early 2012, Bash scored a record deal with Jammo Art Production; an American music production company with its main headquarters in Cairo, Egypt.  Bash released his debut album, Yaa Mnn, in July 2012 during the Holy month of Ramadan. Upon its release, Yaa Mnn received positive reviews from media, press and music critics as it topped the Mazika albums chart for weeks. In 2013, Bash  participated in the campaign of "Hakki Etaalam" in order to get Syrian children back to school 

Bash is currently working with Jammo Art Production on his first new Pop album 'Ana Almoshtaq' set to be released in 2014.

Discography

Singles

Albums

Videography

Awards

External links 
Official Website : Mohamad Bash | Coming Soon

References 

Living people
1982 births
21st-century Syrian male singers
People from Damascus
Syrian Muslims
Star Academy participants
Syrian Kurdish people